Antoine Aveline (1691–1743) was a French engraver, son of Pierre Aveline and brother of Pierre-Alexandre Aveline.

Biography
Aveline was born and worked all his life in Paris. He primarily worked with copperplate in his engraving.

References

1691 births
1743 deaths
18th-century French engravers
Engravers from Paris